George Johnson Clarke  (October 10, 1857 – February 26, 1917) was a New Brunswick lawyer, journalist and politician.

A native of St. Andrews, New Brunswick, George Clarke taught school for a time in Charlotte County before studying law. He was called to the bar in 1885 and set up practice in St. Stephen. He was also editor of the Saint Croix Courier newspaper in St. Stephen.  In 1907, he was named King's Counsel.

In 1891, Clarke was an unsuccessful candidate in the Charlotte riding for a seat in the House of Commons of Canada. He served as mayor of St. Stephen from 1898 to 1899 and was Warden of Charlotte County. He was elected to the Legislative Assembly of New Brunswick for Charlotte County in 1903 and served as Speaker of the Legislative Assembly of New Brunswick from 1909 to 1914. On January 22, 1914, Clarke was appointed by Premier James K. Flemming to the province's Executive Council as Attorney General and Commissioner of Provincial Hospitals. He served until December 17 of that year when he was appointed Minister of Lands and Mines, a position he held until February 1, 1917.
 
Highly regarded for his integrity, George Clarke became the 15th premier of New Brunswick in March 1914 when his predecessor, James Kidd Flemming, was forced to resign as a result of a scandal. In addition to his responsibilities as Premier, Clarke also served as the Minister of Lands and Mines during his entire administration.

George Clarke was in very poor health during his time in office and his administration's accomplishments were limited. Because of the health problems, he stepped down as premier on February 1, 1917, handing over the reins of power to James Alexander Murray just before the general election. Clarke had been selected for appointment as the province's Lieutenant Governor but was not able to accept the post due to poor health. Clarke died at home in St. Stephen a few weeks later.

References 

 Government of New Brunswick biography (pdf)

Further reading
 Arthur T. Doyle, Front Benches and Back Rooms: A story of corruption, muckraking, raw partisanship and political intrigue in New Brunswick, Toronto: Green Tree Publishing, 1976.

1857 births
1917 deaths
Canadian schoolteachers
Canadian newspaper editors
Canadian male journalists
Lawyers in New Brunswick
Canadian King's Counsel
Mayors of places in New Brunswick
Progressive Conservative Party of New Brunswick MLAs
Members of the Executive Council of New Brunswick
Speakers of the Legislative Assembly of New Brunswick
Premiers of New Brunswick
People from St. Stephen, New Brunswick
People from Saint Andrews, New Brunswick